Tarsha Nicole Jones (born October 24, 1969), better known as Miss Jones, is a former R&B artist and radio personality. She previously worked for WQHT in New York City and 103.9 The Beat and WUSL in Philadelphia. Miss Jones was the first black woman to host Morning Radio on a hip hop radio format.

Early life
Jones graduated with honors from the Fiorello H. LaGuardia High School of Music & Art and Performing Arts, having majored in classical music. She also has a bachelor's degree in music from Syracuse University. After graduating from college, she worked several jobs until her chance meeting of Doug E. Fresh in front of Men's Walkers shoe store on 125th st where she was signed on the spot after an impromptu audition.

Career

Radio
Before becoming host of WQHT's Miss Jones in the Morning show, Jones was a Tommy Boy and Motown records recording artist. Having appeared alongside several Hip Hop icons, Jones achieved gold and multi-platinum recording success. Jones also acted in several movies such as Paper Soldiers, Corrupt, The Wrecking Crew and the RocAfella Records inspired film, Death of a Dynasty.
Miss Jones was an integral part of the Star and Buc Wild morning show on Hot 97.

She wrote a Best selling autobiography, Have You Met Miss Jones?: The Life and Loves of Radio's Most Controversial Diva, in 2007, published by Random House.

On June 28, 2008, WQHT's contract with Jones expired, and she returned to the airwaves of Philadelphia, a city that adorned Jones with the Key to the City and several mayoral awards for her community service endeavors.

In January 2012 Jones developed and launched Jonesyradio.com, but due to the perils of Hurricane Sandy the broadcast was short lived.

Beginning August 22, 2022, Jones will host mornings at classic hip-hop "94.7 The Block" WXBK in Newark, New Jersey.

Controversy
In 2005, Jones was suspended for two weeks because of controversial remarks she made on the air. The issue was a parody song titled "Tsunami Song", written by Rick Delgado to disparage Asians after the 2004 Indian Ocean earthquake and tsunami. Delgado was fired from the radio station, along with Todd Lynn who made "offensive racial comments" on the air. Jones was suspended for her heated on-air response to Miss Info, a Korean-American, who voiced her disapproval of the song.

Bibliography
 Jones, Tarsha. Have You Met Miss Jones?: The Life and Loves of Radio's Most Controversial Diva. New York: Random House: 2007. .

Discography

Albums

Singles

As featured artist

References 

20th-century African-American women singers
African-American radio personalities
American contemporary R&B singers
Singers from New York City
Syracuse University alumni
1969 births
Living people
Race-related controversies in radio
21st-century African-American people
21st-century African-American women